For other islands with similar names, see Linga (disambiguation)

Urie Lingey is one of the Shetland Islands. It is between Fetlar and Unst, and Yell is to the west.

Geography

Urie Lingey is 1 km north of Urie Ness on Fetlar , whence the name. Lingey means a "heather island".

Daaey is to the south east, and Sound Gruney to the west. Wedder Holm is to the north east.

See also

 List of islands of Scotland

References

 Shetlopedia

Uninhabited islands of Shetland